Ninine or Niníne is a name.

List of people with the given name 

 Niníne Éces (born circa 800), Irish poet
 Ninine Garcia, French guitarist

List of people with the surname 

 Jules Ninine (1903–1969), politician from France, Guadeloupe and Cameroon

Given names
Surnames
French given names
Surnames of French origin